Viborg municipality is a municipality (Danish, kommune) in Region Midtjylland on the Jutland peninsula in northern Denmark.  The municipality covers an area of 1,421.04 km2, and has a population of 96,847 (1. January 2022).  Søren Pape Poulsen was chosen as mayor again for a second term of office 2014–17, but before the first year of his second term had passed, he accepted an offer to become chairman of his party, and a new mayor had to be chosen among the municipal council members. Its mayor from 3 September 2014 is Torsten Nielsen, also a member of the Conservative People's Party. He is mayor in the rest of the 2014-17 term of office.

The main city and the site of its municipal council is the city of Viborg.

On 1 January 2007 Viborg municipality was, as the result of Kommunalreformen ("The Municipal Reform" of 2007), merged with Bjerringbro, Fjends, Karup, Møldrup, and Tjele municipalities  to form an enlarged Viborg municipality.

The municipality is part of Business Region Aarhus and of the East Jutland metropolitan area, which had a total population of 1.378 million in 2016.

Locations

Politics

Municipal council
Viborg's municipal council consists of 31 members, elected every four years.

Below are the municipal councils elected since the Municipal Reform of 2007.

Twin cities
Viborg has a twin city in each of the Nordic countries, as well as in other world regions.

See also
World Map at Lake Klejtrup

Sources 
 Municipal statistics: NetBorger Kommunefakta, delivered from KMD aka Kommunedata (Municipal Data)
 Municipal mergers and neighbors: Eniro new municipalities map
 Searchable/printable municipal maps: Krak mapsearch(outline visible but doesn't print out!)

References

External links 

 

 

 
Municipalities of the Central Denmark Region
Municipalities of Denmark
Populated places established in 2007